Principles of Geometry is an electronic music band  from Lille, France, which consists of Guillaume Grosso and Jeremy Duval.

Discography

Albums 
 Principles Of Geometry (2005, Tigersushi)
 Lazare (2007, Tigersushi)
 Burn the Land and Boil the Oceans (2012, Tigersushi)
 Meanstream (2014, Tigersushi)
 ABCDEFGHIJKLMNOPQRSTUVWXYZ (2022, Tigersushi)

Singles, 12" and 7"
 A Mountain For President EP (2007, Tigersushi)
 Interstate Highway System (2008, Tigersushi)
 The Effect Of Adding Another Zero (Principles Of Geometry's Distributive & Associative Part One) (2009, Tigersushi/Pandamaki Records)
 P.O.G vs. THE EDITS EP (edits by KRIKOR, PILOOSKI & JOAKIM) (2011, Tigersushi Records)

Remixes

External links 
Label Tigersushi, Principles of Geometry publishing company 
 
Official Myspace
Official Facebook Page
Official Facebook group

References

 http://www.forcedexposure.com/artists/principles.of.geometry.html

French electronic music groups
Musical groups from Hauts-de-France